Standings and results for Group C of the UEFA Euro 2008 qualifying tournament.

Greece secured qualification to the tournament proper on 17 October 2007 following a 1–0 win against Turkey, becoming the second team in the whole of the qualification stage to do so. Turkey secured qualification to the tournament proper on 21 November 2007 following a 1–0 win against Bosnia and Herzegovina, becoming the twelfth team in the whole of the qualification stage to do so.

Standings

Matches 
Group C fixtures were negotiated and finally decided by a draw at a meeting between the participants in Istanbul, Turkey on 17 February 2006.

On 3 July 2006, the Hellenic Football Federation was indefinitely suspended from all international competition due to concerns about its autonomy from the Greek government. Although no announcement was made regarding this tournament in particular, this seemed to preclude the Greek team from participating. Following rectifying action by the Greek government, FIFA subsequently lifted the suspension on 12 July 2006, allowing Greece to participate in qualifying.

Goalscorers

Notes

References 
UEFA website

Group C
2006–07 in Bosnia and Herzegovina football
2007–08 in Bosnia and Herzegovina football
2006–07 in Maltese football
2007–08 in Maltese football
2006–07 in Hungarian football
2007–08 in Hungarian football
2006–07 in Moldovan football
2007–08 in Moldovan football
2006–07 in Greek football
2007–08 in Greek football
Greece at UEFA Euro 2008
2006–07 in Turkish football
2007–08 in Turkish football
Turkey at UEFA Euro 2008
2006 in Norwegian football
2007 in Norwegian football